Lumber City is a city located in Telfair County, Georgia, United States. As of the 2020 census, the city had a total population of 967.

History
The Georgia General Assembly incorporated Lumber City as a town in 1889. The community was named for a sawmill near the original town site.

Geography 

Lumber City is located at 31°55'48" North, 82°41'1" West (31.930033, -82.683723).

U.S. Route 23/341 is the main route through the city, and leads northwest 17 mi (27 km) to McRae-Helena, the Telfair County seat, and southeast 7 mi (11 km) to Hazlehurst. Other highways that run through the city include Georgia State Routes 19 and 117.

According to the United States Census Bureau, the city has a total area of 1.9 square miles (5.0 km2), all land.

It is located at the confluence of the Ocmulgee and Oconee rivers, which combine to form the Altamaha River.

Demographics

2020 census

As of the 2020 United States census, there were 967 people, 494 households, and 268 families residing in the city.

2000 census
As of the census of 2000, there were 1,247 people, 488 households, and 309 families residing in the city. The racial makeup of the city was 46.75% White, 51.40% African American, 0.08% Native American, 0.00% Asian, 0.00% Pacific Islander, 1.28% from other races, and 0.48% from two or more races.  2.65% of the population were Hispanic or Latino of any race.

There were 488 households, out of which 29.3% had children under the age of 18 living with them, 37.3% were married couples living together, 23.0% had a female householder with no husband present, and 36.5% were non-families. 33.2% of all households were made up of individuals, and 12.7% had someone living alone who was 65 years of age or older.  The average household size was 2.40 and the average family size was 3.06.

In the city, the population was spread out, with 25.7% under the age of 18, 8.1% from 18 to 24, 23.8% from 25 to 44, 23.1% from 45 to 64, and 19.3% who were 65 years of age or older.  The median age was 39 years.  For every 100 females, there were 79.4 males.  For every 100 females age 18 and over, there were 70.4 males.

The median income for a household in the city was $18,555, and the median income for a family was $25,568. Males had a median income of $22,802 versus $17,031 for females. The per capita income for the city was $12,271.  25.3% of the population and 18.9% of families were below the poverty line.  Out of the total population, 32.8% of those under the age of 18 and 29.1% of those 65 and older were living below the poverty line.

In 2010, Lumber City had the 19th-lowest median household income of all places in the United States with a population over 1,000.

References

Cities in Georgia (U.S. state)
Cities in Telfair County, Georgia